Qaradağlı (also, Karadaglidjenam and Karadagly) is a village and municipality in the Ujar Rayon of Azerbaijan.  It has a population of 3,307.

References 

Populated places in Ujar District